The Preis des Winterfavoriten is a Group 3 flat horse race in Germany open to two-year-old thoroughbreds. It is run at Cologne over a distance of 1,600 metres (about 1 mile), and it is scheduled to take place each year in October.

History
The event was established in 1899, and it was originally contested at Cologne over 1,600 metres. It was held at Karlshorst in 1919, and cut to 1,400 metres in 1920.

The race was staged at Hoppegarten in 1940. It was switched to Munich and reverted to 1,600 metres in 1946. It returned to Cologne in 1947.

For a period the Preis des Winterfavoriten was classed at Listed level. It was given Group 3 status in 1998. It took place at Düsseldorf in 2012.

Records
Leading jockey (6 wins):
 Otto Schmidt – Graf Ferry (1920), Lentulus (1921), Favor (1924), Janitor (1932), Elritzling (1936), Peperl (1940)
 Georg Bocskai – Lagunas (1983), Lirung (1984), Zampano (1986), Bluegrass Native (1989), Treecracker (1990), El Maimoun (1997)

Leading trainer (9 wins):
 Heinz Jentzsch – Dschingis Khan (1963), Lombard (1969), Experte (1971), Esclavo (1978), Lagunas (1983), Lirung (1984), Oldtimer (1985), Zampano (1986), Lando (1992)
 (note: the trainers of some of the early winners are unknown)

Winners since 1970

 The 2012 running took place at Düsseldorf. The 2013 running took place at Munich

Earlier winners
 1899: Hagen
 1900: Slyvnitza
 1901: Sirocco
 1902: Barcarole
 1903: Bravour
 1904: Ganges
 1905: Fels
 1906: Hochzeit
 1907: For Ever
 1908: Fervor
 1909: Hort
 1910: Malteser
 1911: Dolomit
 1912: Fabella
 1913: Orelio
 1914–15: no race
 1916: Ayesha
 1917: Traum
 1918: Tulipan
 1919: Nubier
 1920: Graf Ferry
 1921: Lentulus
 1922: Revolutionär

 1923: no race
 1924: Favor
 1925: Wachholder
 1926: Mah Jong
 1927: Contessa Maddalena
 1928: Tantris
 1929: Mellitus
 1930: Adrienne
 1931: Aventin
 1932: Janitor
 1933: Waffenschmied
 1934: Artischocke
 1935: Edel-Bitter
 1936: Elritzling
 1937: Astrologie
 1938: Tatjana
 1939: Fortissimo
 1940: Peperl
 1941: Adlerflug
 1942: Aufbruch
 1943: Schildhorn
 1944–45: no race
 1946: Xantos

 1947: Signal
 1948: Schütze
 1949: Asterios
 1950: Grande
 1951: Grenzbock
 1952: Yorck
 1953: Giovanni
 1954: Macbeth
 1955: Liebeslied
 1956: Solotänzerin
 1957: Leichtsinn
 1958: Basuto
 1959: Wiener Walzer
 1960: Baalim
 1961: Amboss
 1962: Gracchus
 1963: Dschingis Khan
 1964: Waidwerk
 1965: Bandit
 1966: Silbersee
 1967: Tamus
 1968: Tannenbruch
 1969: Lombard

See also
 List of German flat horse races

References
 Racing Post / siegerlisten.com:
 1982, 1983, 1984, 1985, 1986, 1987, 1988, 1989, 1990, 1991
 1992, 1993, 1994, 1995, 1996, 1997, 
 galopp-sieger.de – Preis des Winterfavoriten.
 horseracingintfed.com – International Federation of Horseracing Authorities – Preis des Winterfavoriten (2012).
 pedigreequery.com – Preis des Winterfavoriten – Köln.

Flat horse races for two-year-olds
Horse races in Germany
Recurring sporting events established in 1899
Sport in Cologne